Chang Ta-chun (14 June 1957) is a notable Taiwanese author and literary critic. He is the author of many novels, two of which, Wild Child ( 野孩子 ) and My Kid Sister (我妹妹), were published together in the U.S. as Wild Kids.

Educational background
B.A. and M.A. form Fu Jen Catholic University.

References

Taiwanese male novelists
1957 births
Living people
Fu Jen Catholic University alumni
International Writing Program alumni
Taiwanese male short story writers
20th-century Taiwanese short story writers
20th-century male writers